Gaetan-Joseph Serré (January 24, 1938 – November 24, 2017) was a Canadian politician, who represented the riding of Nickel Belt in the House of Commons of Canada from 1968 to 1972. He was a member of the Liberal Party.

Serré won the riding in 1968, defeating New Democrat Norman Fawcett. He served a single term, losing the riding in the next election to another New Democrat candidate, John Rodriguez.

Serré subsequently returned to teaching. In 2003, he launched a new Voice over Internet Protocol (VoIP) telephone business in Sturgeon Falls with his daughter Lynne Gervais and son Marc Serré. PhoneNet Communications was sold to Unitz Online in 2005.

His younger brother Benoît Serré served in the House of Commons from 1993 to 2004, and his son Marc was elected to the House of Commons in the 2015 federal election as MP for Nickel Belt.

Serré died of cancer on November 24, 2017, at the age of 79.

Election results

References

External links
 

1938 births
2017 deaths
Liberal Party of Canada MPs
Members of the House of Commons of Canada from Ontario
Franco-Ontarian people
People from West Nipissing